Movistar is a major telecommunications provider owned by Telefónica, operating in Spain and Hispanic American countries. It is the largest provider of landline, broadband, mobile services, and pay television (Movistar+) in Spain. Movistar is the second-largest wireless carrier in Mexico, with 25.8 million subscribers as of January 2020.

History 
The Movistar brand has been in use in Spain since the launch of GSM services in 1995. The name became effective worldwide on April 5, 2005, after Telefónica purchased the BellSouth mobile operations branch in South America. After the purchase of O2 in 2005 by Telefónica, the company announced that the «O2» brand would continue to be used in the United Kingdom and Germany, as a separate branch with its own board and management structure.

Countries where Telefónica operates under the Movistar brand

 Argentina (formerly Telefónica Unifón and Movicom BellSouth)
 Chile (formerly Telefónica Móvil and BellSouth)
 Colombia (formerly Telefónica Telecom, Telecom, BellSouth, Cocelco, CeluMovil)
 Ecuador (formerly CelularPower, BellSouth)
 El Salvador (formerly Telefónica Móviles or Telefónica MoviStar)
 Mexico (formerly Cedetel, Bajacel, Movitel, Norcel and Pegaso)
 Peru (formerly Telefónica Móviles and BellSouth)
 Spain (formerly Telefónica MoviStar)
 Uruguay (formerly Telefónica Unifón and Movicom BellSouth)
 Venezuela (formerly Telcel and Telcel BellSouth)
 Antarctica

Former operations
 Guatemala (acquired by América Móvil, now operating as Claro)
 Costa Rica (acquired by Liberty Latin America, now operating as LIBERTY)

Countries where Telefónica operates under other brands
 Brazil (formerly Telesp and Telefônica, now under the Vivo brand)
 Czech Republic (under the O2 brand)
 Germany (under the O2 brand)
 United Kingdom (under the O2 brand)

Advertisements 

The 1983 song "Walking on Sunshine" by Katrina and the Waves was used by Telefónica to announce the unification of all its operation brands (Telefónica MoviStar, Bellsouth, Unifon, Telefónica Moviles, Telefónica Movil, and Movicom) in Latin America and Spain under the Movistar brand after the takeover of BellSouth's Latin America division. Movistar has also used the New Radicals' hit "You Get What You Give" and "Two Princes" by Spin Doctors. Currently "Hey, Soul Sister" by Train is in advertising and other versions of the song are also used in audiovisual advertisements.

See also

References

External links

 

Telecommunications companies established in 1995
1995 establishments in Spain
Telefónica
Telecommunications companies of Spain
Companies based in the Community of Madrid
Mobile phone companies of Chile
Mobile phone companies of Colombia
Mobile phone companies of Ecuador
Mobile phone companies of El Salvador
Mobile phone companies of Guatemala
Mobile phone companies of Mexico
Mobile phone companies of Spain
Spanish brands
Tier 1 networks